Vlădești is a commune located in Vâlcea County, Oltenia, Romania. It is composed of five villages: Fundătura, Pleașa, Priporu, Trundin and Vlădești.

References

Communes in Vâlcea County
Localities in Oltenia